Nico Ali Walsh (born July 11, 2000) is an American professional boxer. The grandson of Muhammad Ali, Walsh came into the ring for his pro debut in August 2021 wearing his grandfather’s personal white Everlast shorts, which were passed down to him in 2016 with the death of his grandfather.

Professional career
Before going pro in 2021, Ali Walsh spent a few months training alongside world-renowned boxing trainer, Abel Sanchez, in Big Bear Lake, California. After having a "limited" amateur boxing career of approximately 30 bouts, Walsh decided to turn pro in early 2021. He began working with Tyson Fury's current trainer, SugarHill Steward, and is promoted by Bob Arum's Top Rank, who also promoted 27 of his grandfather's fights.

Walsh made his professional debut against Jordan Weeks on the Joshua Franco vs. Andrew Moloney III undercard, on August 14, 2021. He won the fight by a first-round technical knockout. Walsh was booked to face James Westley II, in his second professional bout, on October 23, 2021 on the undercard of the WBO super featherweight championship between Shakur Stevenson and Jamel Herring. He won the fight by a third-round technical knockout. Walsh faced Reyes Sanchez on December 11, 2021, on the undercard of Vasyl Lomachenko vs Richard Commey. In his final fight of the year,  He won the fight by a majority decision, with scores of 40–36, 38–38 and 39–37.

Walsh faced Jeremiah Yeager on January 29, 2022, on the undercard of the WBC super featherweight title eliminator between Robson Conceicao and Xavier Martinez. He won the fight by a second-round technical knockout.

Walsh faced Alejandro Ibarra on April 30, 2022, on the undercard of the WBC and WBO super featherweight unification between Shakur Stevenson and Oscar Valdez. He won the fight via 1st round knockout. Walsh also said he hoped to stay active and fight again before he hit a year in professional boxing.

Walsh fought again against Reyes Sanchez as Walsh did not like how he performed against him, as he thought the fight was close (one of the judges thought the fight was a draw, resulting in a majority decision). Walsh knocked out Reyes Sanchez in the second round at Pechanga Arena in San Diego, California.

Personal life
Walsh is a Muslim. He is a grandson of Muhammad Ali and nephew of Laila Ali.

Walsh saw the tough time that both Muhammad and Laila Ali had while boxing and debated whether or not to follow in their footsteps. In the end it was his grandfather that kept him involved with the sport.

Professional boxing record

References

External links

Living people
2000 births
21st-century Muslims
American male boxers
Boxers from Chicago
Sportspeople from Illinois
Middleweight boxers
African-American Muslims
American people of Irish descent
American people of Malagasy descent